The 2020–21 Drake Bulldogs men's basketball team represented Drake University during the 2020–21 NCAA Division I men's basketball season. The Bulldogs are led by third-year head coach Darian DeVries. They played their home games at Knapp Center on campus in Des Moines, Iowa, as members of the Missouri Valley Conference (MVC). In a season limited due to the ongoing COVID-19 pandemic, the Bulldogs finished the season 26–5, 15–3 in MVC play to finish in second place. In the quarterfinals of the MVC tournament, they advanced to the semifinals after Northern Iowa was forced to forfeit due to COVID-19 issues. They defeated Missouri State in the semifinals before losing to Loyola in the championship game. They received an at-large bid to the NCAA tournament as a No. 11 seed in the First Four. They defeated Wichita State to advance to the First Round where they were eliminated by USC.

Previous season 
The Bulldogs finished the season 20–14, 8–10 in MVC play to finish in eighth place. They defeated Illinois State and Northern Iowa to advance to the semifinals of the MVC tournament where they lost to Bradley. All postseason tournaments were thereafter canceled due to the ongoing COVID-19 pandemic.

Offseason

Departures

Incoming transfers

2020 recruiting class

Roster

Schedule and results

|-
!colspan=9 style=| Non-conference regular season

|-
!colspan=9 style=| MVC regular season

|-
!colspan=12 style=| MVC tournament

|-
!colspan=12 style=| NCAA tournament
|-

Source

Rankings

*AP does not release post-NCAA Tournament rankings^Coaches did not release a Week 1 poll.

References

Drake Bulldogs men's basketball seasons
Drake
Drake
Drake
Drake